Ulrich Donovan Ewolo (born 16 June 1996) is a Cameroonian football player who currently plays as a forward for Chinese Super League club Zhejiang. He played two seasons in the USL Championship while on loan to North Carolina.

Career
Ahead of the 2020 season, Ewolo and teammate Pascal Eboussi joined Swedish Division 1 side IFK Luleå on loan but their arrival at the club was delayed due to travel bans arising from the COVID-19 pandemic.

Career statistics

References

External links

1996 births
Living people
Cameroonian footballers
Cameroonian expatriate footballers
North Carolina FC players
Association football forwards
USL Championship players
Heilongjiang Ice City F.C. players
Zhejiang Professional F.C. players
China League One players
Chinese Super League players
Expatriate footballers in China